Timothy Reckart is an American animator and director based in Los Angeles, specializing in puppet stop motion.  He is best known for his 2012 film Head over Heels, nominated for the Academy Award for Best Animated Short Film in 2013.

Reckart grew up in Tucson, Arizona, where he attended University High School.  He studied History and Literature at Harvard University where he graduated in 2009.  He later attended the National Film and Television School in Beaconsfield, Buckinghamshire, UK, where he graduated in 2012 from the Directing Animation course. Reckart is currently based in Los Angeles where he also does work in multiplane collage animation, digital 2D animation, and pixilation. In 2017, he directed the Christian computer-animated film based on the Nativity of Jesus, The Star, for Sony Pictures Animation.

Filmography
Leftovers (2006, director, writer, editor, producer)
Token Hunchback (2009, director, writer)
Head over Heels (2012, director, writer, animator)
Los Jarochos: A Sketch Show (2013, director, editor)
Tumble Leaf (2015, animator)
Anomalisa (2015, lead animator)
Armikrog (2015, animator)
 Community (2015, animator)
Panchagavya (2015, editor)
Grand Opening (2016, director, writer)
The Star (2017, director)
High in the Clouds (2023, director)

References

External links

1980s births
Living people
Year of birth missing (living people)
American directors
American animators
American animated film directors
Stop motion animators
Harvard University alumni
Alumni of the National Film and Television School
Sony Pictures Animation people